Evernia is a genus of bushy lichens in the family Parmeliaceae.

Description

Oakmoss Evernia prunastri is used as a fixative agent in Eau de Cologne within the perfume industry. It is green on top and white on bottom, and divides evenly into "forks"; it becomes very soft when wet. It is not to be confused with Ramalina, which is straplike, stiff and bristly, green on top and bottom, and divides unevenly. Evernia is an abundant genus, found growing on trees.

References

Parmeliaceae
Lecanorales genera
Lichen genera
Taxa named by Erik Acharius
Taxa described in 1809